Texas A&M Veterinary Medical Diagnostic Laboratory (TVMDL) is an integral part of the Texas A&M University System. It consists of four lab locations spread across Texas; two full-service laboratories located in Amarillo and College Station and two poultry laboratories in Center and Gonzales.

Established in 1916 and formally created by the Sixtieth Texas Legislature in 1967, the Texas A&M Veterinary Medical Diagnostic Laboratory contains some of the busiest full-service veterinary diagnostic laboratories in the world.
 TVMDL receives more than 160,000 cases in need of diagnostic assistance each year.

TVMDL has a major branch located in College Station, Texas on the Texas A&M University campus. It is not associated with the GI Lab|Texas A&M Gastrointestinal Lab, also located on the same campus. Both labs conduct veterinary diagnostic tests.

In 1981, Texas A&M Veterinary Medical Diagnostic Laboratory discovered a new strain of anthrax dubbed the Ames strain, which isolated from a diseased 14-month-old Beefmaster heifer that died in Sarita, Texas. This particular strain was later used in the 2001 anthrax attacks in which seven letters mailed to media outlets and US Senators on September 18, 2001, and October 9, 2001.

Sources
Official website

References

Texas A&M University System
Veterinary research institutes
1916 establishments in Texas
Veterinary medicine in the United States